Het Huis der Nederlanden is a social institute in Pinelands, South Africa which provides a library and social meetings for the Dutch population of the town. It also contains two conference rooms where general meetings by Dutch people, as well as foreigners, are held. It is now known as the South African Centre for the Netherlands and Flanders.

References

Event venues in South Africa